Ipsea speciosa, the daffodil orchid, is a rare  wild orchid found in the hills of Sri Lanka and southern India. It is a terrestrial herb with pseudobulbous stem. The lanceolate leaves of the plant are grass like and pointed at the end. Its large flowers appear from September to February, they are bright yellow and sweet-scented.

This plant can be seen in grass lands and pathana areas in mid hills of the country. The plant is known as නගා මැරූ අල in the Sinhala language, meaning "Yam which killed the little sister" according to a folk tale.

Like the glory lily, the daffodil orchid is used as an ingredient in making love charm portions and aphrodisiacs in local medicine.

Folk tale 
A young princess walking along the jungle path with her elder brother suddenly attempted to provoke him to make love and have sexual intercourse with her. The prince got extremely angry and killed her instantly.

Later, searching for her unusual behavior, he found that she was innocent and her erotic feeling has aroused due to consuming of a tiny  piece of the yam of a plant by mistake. Thereafter this plant, Ipsea speciosa, is known as “the yam which killed the younger sister” among locals.

References 

speciosa
Orchids of India
Orchids of Sri Lanka
Plants described in 1831